Clifton is an unincorporated community in Oregon County, in the U.S. state of Missouri.

The community derives its name from George and William J. Cliff, early settlers.

References

Unincorporated communities in Oregon County, Missouri
Unincorporated communities in Missouri